Ilian Ilianov Iliev (born 20 August 1999), also known as Ilian Iliev Jr., is a Bulgarian professional footballer who plays as an attacking midfielder for Apollon Limassol.

Club career

Cherno More
Ilian made his first team league début in a 1–3 home defeat against Ludogorets on 9 September 2016, coming on as substitute for Georgi Iliev. He scored his first goal in the top division of Bulgarian football on 30 August 2019, in the 1–1 draw with Dunav Ruse.

On 31 July 2017, Iliev joined Académica de Coimbra's academy.

On 19 July 2021, Iliev agreed a deal to join Cypriot First Division side Apollon Limassol on a four-year contract.

International career
He made his debut for Bulgaria national football team on 25 March 2021 in a World Cup qualifier against Switzerland.

Personal life
He is the son of former footballer and current manager Ilian Iliev Sr.

Career statistics

References

External links
 
 

1999 births
Living people
Sportspeople from Funchal
Bulgarian footballers
Bulgaria youth international footballers
Portuguese footballers
Portuguese people of Bulgarian descent
Association football midfielders
PFC Cherno More Varna players
First Professional Football League (Bulgaria) players
Bulgaria under-21 international footballers
Bulgaria international footballers